Lee Jae-ik (born 21 May 1999) is a South Korean football defender who plays for Seoul E-Land and the South Korea national team.

Career statistics

Club

Honours

International

South Korea U20
FIFA U-20 World Cup runner-up: 2019

South Korea 

 EAFF E-1 Football Championship runner-up: 2022

References

1999 births
Living people
Association football defenders
South Korean footballers
South Korean expatriate footballers
Gangwon FC players
Al-Rayyan SC players
Royal Antwerp F.C. players
K League 1 players
Qatar Stars League players
Belgian Pro League players
Expatriate footballers in Qatar
South Korean expatriate sportspeople in Qatar
Expatriate footballers in Belgium
South Korean expatriate sportspeople in Belgium
South Korea under-20 international footballers